The American Boat and Yacht Council is a non-profit organization which sets standards for the safe construction and maintenance of boats in the United States. It is a standards development member of the American National Standards Institute. Founded in 1954, it is currently chaired by Kenneth Weinbrecht of Ocean-Bay Marine Services, Inc. It sets standards on items such as required electrical cable color coding, size and construction. Some standards, such as bilge pump requirements, are legally binding.

References

External links 
 

Organizations established in 1954
1954 establishments in New York (state)
501(c)(3) organizations
Standards organizations in the United States
Boat building